Jerzy Mniszech (c. 1548 – 1613) was a Polish nobleman and diplomat in the Polish–Lithuanian Commonwealth. Member of the House of Mniszech. Krajczy koronny in 1574, castellan of Radom in 1583, voivode of Sandomierz Voivodship in 1590, żupnik ruski, starost of Lwów in 1593, starost of Sambor, Sokal, Sanok, Rohatyn.

Biography
Father of Marina Mniszech (c. 1588—1614). Dealt with providing courtisans for the courts of some Commonwealth magnates. He is known for meddling in the Muscovy Times of Troubles, as he wed his daughter Marina to the False Dmitri I and later convinced her to marry the False Dmitri II.

He had several other children. His daughter Urszula Mniszech, born in 1603, married prince Konstanty Wiśniowiecki, voivode of Russia (1564–1641). Anna Mniszech married Piotr Szyszkowski, castellan of Wojno. Eufrozyna Mniszech married Hermolaus Jordan. Mikołaj Mniszech (1587–1613) became starost of Łuków and Stanisław Bonifacy Mniszech (?-1644) became a starost of Lwów in 1613, Sambor, Gliniany; married (1602/1603) Zofia ks. Hołowczyńska. Stefan Jan Mniszech became starost of Sanok. Franciszek Bernard Mniszech became castellan sądecki in 1638, starost sanocki i szczyrzycki, married Barbara Stadnicka. from Nowy Żmigród.

Jerzy Mniszech is one of the personas on the painting by Jan Matejko: Kazanie Skargi (The Sermon of Piotr Skarga).

Notes
Sources vary

External links
Mniszech genealogy

Secular senators of the Polish–Lithuanian Commonwealth
1540s births
1613 deaths
Converts to Roman Catholicism from Calvinism
Jerzy